Mirial is a privately held Italian company providing products for visual communication in video/voice over IP, 3G/UMTS, IMS and Unified messaging areas; it engineers and develops appliances and software endpoints for enterprise-grade videoconferencing on converged networks and for IMS PC-to-3G Video Telephony.

On July 20, 2011, Logitech announced acquisition of Mirial.

See also 
Videoconferencing
IMS
Professional video over IP
Voice over IP
Video Telephony

Press sources 

The sources cited below are all articles from the Italian press (newspapers or collaterals and magazines).
Mirial 4.0 di DyLogic, "La Repubblica - Affari e Finanza", 2004, 21, 24
DyLogic inaugura due divisioni mirate alle Tlc, "Il Corriere delle Telecomunicazioni - Aziende e Finanza", 2004, 328, 22
Il client video Mirial (release 3.0) di DyLogic conquista il listino Vcm di pointercom, "Il Corriere delle Telecomunicazioni - Aziende e Finanza", 2004, 315, 21
Oltre la videoconferenza, il real time è realtà, "Il Mondo", 2004, 1/2, 71
Videocomunicazione - In arrivo il nuovo Mirial, "Il Corriere delle Telecomunicazioni", 2003, 308, 10
FASTWEB lancia gli SMS grazie a DyLogic, "Il Corriere delle Telecomunicazioni - Aziende e Finanza", 2003, 304, 24
VoIP: provider italiani alla riscossa, Week.it, 2003, 25, 14

Telecommunications companies established in 1999
Telecommunications companies of Italy
Teleconferencing
Videotelephony
Logitech
Italian companies established in 1999
2011 mergers and acquisitions